This list is of the Historic Sites of Japan located within the Prefecture of Kagawa.

National Historic Sites
As of 1 December 2020, twenty-five Sites have been designated as being of national significance (including one *Special Historic Site).

Prefectural Historic Sites
As of 1 May 2020, twenty-nine Sites have been designated as being of prefectural importance.

Municipal Historic Sites
As of 1 May 2020, a further one hundred and forty Sites have been designated as being of municipal importance.

See also

 Cultural Properties of Japan
 Sanuki Province
 The Kagawa Museum
 List of Places of Scenic Beauty of Japan (Kagawa)
 List of Cultural Properties of Japan - paintings (Kagawa)

References

External links
  Cultural Properties in Kagawa Prefecture
  Historic Sites in Kagawa Prefecture

Kagawa Prefecture
 Kagawa